Elections to Metropolitan Borough of Southwark were held on Monday 2 November 1925.

The borough council had sixty councillors, all of whom were elected together at triennial elections. The borough was divided into ten wards which returned between 3 and 9 members. In addition to the councillors, the council also included aldermen. Aldermen had a six-year term of office, with 5 seats being filled every three years at the first council meeting after each election.

Election result

|}

References

Council elections in the London Borough of Southwark
1925 in London
1925 English local elections